Letopis was a Russian monthly journal published in St Petersburg from December 1915 until December 1917. It had a range of material including literary, scientific and political material. Its political stance was to oppose nationalism and the First World War. Officially A. F. Radzishevsky was the editor but in practice Maxim Gorky edited the paper.

Under the Tsarist regime Letopis was continually censored for an anti-war stance. Nikolai Sukhanov, described how the editors used to meet in Gorky's flat, in particular during the February Revolution:
"One after another people both known and unknown to me, to Gorky himself as well as to me, kept coming in. They came in for consultation, to share impressions, to make enquiries and to find out what was going on in various circles. Gorky naturally had connections throughout Petersburg, from top to bottom. We began to talk and we, the editors of Letopis, soon set up a united front against representatives of the Left, the internationalist representatives of our own views, heedless of the charges of betrayal of our own watchwords at the decisive moment."

Many of the contributors were involved in the Free Association for the Development and Dissemination of Positive Science (SARRPN) after it was founded in March 1917.

In 1917 the Letopis also made a stand against the Bolsheviks, condemning the Bolshevik seizure of power in October 1917.

Contributors
Letopis attracted a large range of notable contributors:

 Boris Avilov 
 Vladimir Bazarov
 Alexander Blok
 Alexander Bogdanov
 Valery Bryusov
 Ivan Bunin
 Osip Yermansky
 Sergei Yesenin
 Anatole France
 Maxim Gorky
 Lev Kamenev
 Platon Kerzhentsev
 Yuri Larin

 Jack London
 Vladimir Mayakovsky
 Mikhail Olminsky
 Mikhail Prishvin
 A.F. Radzishevsky 
 Romain Rolland 
 Maria Smith-Falkner 
 Nikolai Sukhanov
 Alexander Tikhonov
 Kliment Timiryazev
 Emile Verhaeren 
 H. G. Wells

References

Magazines established in 1915
Magazines disestablished in 1917